The Leander Reeve House, also known as the Old Stone House, is an historic structure located near Geneva, Iowa  United States.  Leander Reeve came to Franklin County from Ashtabula County, Ohio in 1853.  He initially worked as a trapper until he acquired  of land from Allison Phelps and began to farm.  He built the stone house in 1854 and brought his family from Ohio the same year.  It is the first permanent structure built in the county.  His wife did not care for the pioneer lifestyle and they returned to Ohio three years later.  Although some said she wanted to have her last child at her Ohio home, and she also didn't get along with her sister in law. Simeon Carter bought the house from the Reeves.  His daughter and son-in-law, a lawyer named D. W. Dow, were the next people to live in the house.  They were followed by 13 other families.  The floor plan of the house has never been altered and it did not have electricity until the restoration committee had plug-ins installed.  The house is still in excellent shape, and an Old Stone House Committee remains active through the Franklin County Historical Society.  The house has been listed on the National Register of Historic Places since 1979.

References

External links
 Franklin County Historical Society

Houses completed in 1854
Houses in Franklin County, Iowa
Houses on the National Register of Historic Places in Iowa
Historic house museums in Iowa
Museums in Franklin County, Iowa
National Register of Historic Places in Franklin County, Iowa